Yenikaş is a village in Aydıncık district of Mersin Province, Turkey. It is a coastal village on state highway . According to Sir Francis Beaufort, the village was situated in an ancient settlement named Melanie by Strabo, but modern scholarship points to the site being that of Myus. The village was founded by once nomadic Karakeçili tribe of Turkmens. The population of the village was 1,017 as of 2019.

References

Villages in Aydıncık District (Mersin)
Populated coastal places in Turkey